Aimo Nieminen (25 June 1940 – 1 April 2018) was a Finnish weightlifter. He competed in the men's middle heavyweight event at the 1972 Summer Olympics.

References

External links
 

1940 births
2018 deaths
Finnish male weightlifters
Olympic weightlifters of Finland
Weightlifters at the 1972 Summer Olympics
People from Muurame
Sportspeople from Central Finland